Grattis världen ("Congratulations the World") is a television program in which Filip Hammar & Fredrik Wikingsson travel around the world to exotic countries and try unusual and often quite adventurous things. The general plot is quite similar to High Chaparall as Filip and Fredrik interview eccentric people they meet along the way.

Performance artist Pål Hollender, of Swedish Survivor fame, worked on the show as a producer and is seen on camera in several episodes. Some argue he was hired in an effort to promote the show.

The Song The Passenger by Iggy Pop is used as the theme song for the show (though in a cover version by Lars Bygdén).

Episode overview
Season 1:

Kanal 5 (Swedish TV channel) original programming
Swedish reality television series